Arizona State Route 78 (SR 78) and New Mexico State Road 78 (NM 78) are a pair of adjoining state highways located in eastern Arizona and western New Mexico linking U.S. Route 191 (US 191) and Arizona State Route 75 near Greenlee County Airport to  US 180 northwest of Cliff, New Mexico. It is also known in its Arizona stretch as Mule Creek Road.

Route description

The western terminus of SR 78 is located at a junction with US 191 and SR 75 at Three Way, Arizona near Greenlee County Airport. The highway heads northeast from this intersection along Mule Creek Road. There are a few hairpin turns along this stretch of highway as it follows the surrounding terrain. State Road 78 heads eastward through desert, passing through the community of Mule Creek, New Mexico. The road continues eastward until terminating at U.S. Route 180 northwest of Cliff, New Mexico.

History
The highway in Arizona was designated as SR 78 in 1924. Its counterpart in New Mexico was marked as New Mexico State Road 78.  By 1938, it was still just a gravel road as were many roads in the area including US 666. It would remain a gravel road in 1961.  The other state highways in the area were paved by this time including the majority of its counterpart in New Mexico.  By 1971, nearly the entire highway had been paved with the exception of a portion near the New Mexico border.

SR 78 in New Mexico was designated along its current route in the mid-1930s. It was extended to U.S. Route 60 via Mogollon by the mid-1940s and truncated to its present alignment in 1988.

Junction list

See also

References

External links

SR 78 at Arizona Roads

078
Transportation in Greenlee County, Arizona
078
Transportation in Grant County, New Mexico